Raleigh is a town and the county seat of Smith County, Mississippi, United States. The population was 1,094 at the 2020 census, making it the second largest town in Smith County. Named for English explorer Sir Walter Raleigh, Raleigh has been home to such Mississippians as Governor Robert Lowry, Governor/U.S. Senator Anselm McLaurin and pioneer William H. Hardy.

History
Raleigh was first established as the community of Indian Springs and was renamed when the county seat was moved from Fairfield to Raleigh in 1834. The town of Raleigh and its citizens were very active in the Civil War; it was home to numerous companies of the Army of Mississippi and a training camp. In 1863, Raleigh was part of Grierson's Raid which played a major role in the defeat of the Confederate Army at Vicksburg.

Harrison Hotel
The Harrison Hotel, now closed, is a famous hotel. Many Mississippi politicians, governors and U.S. Senators have stayed there, including Theodore G. Bilbo and Jefferson Davis.

Smith County Courthouse
The Smith County Courthouse is the major focal point of the town. Two earlier courthouses were destroyed in fires in the 1800s. The current court house was completed in 1912; but a leak in the roof caused the eventual loss of its signature dome. In 2005, a dedication service was held in honor of a new dome built as a replacement.

A new Chancery Court building was completed in 2009 to make room for county offices and added court room space. The new Chancery Court building is designed in a similar Greek revival design which resembles the County Courthouse.

Climate
Raleigh's tornado activity is slightly above the state's average and 187% above the national average.

Geography
Raleigh is located at  (32.033008, -89.522893).

Demographics

2020 census

As of the 2020 United States census, there were 1,094 people, 435 households, and 255 families residing in the town.

2000 census
At the 2000 census, there were 1,255 people, 482 households and 334 families residing in the town. The population density was 249.0 per square mile (96.1/km). There were 550 housing units at an average density of 109.1 per square mile (42.1/km). The racial makeup of the town was 59.76% White, 39.68% African American, 0.08% Native American, 0.32% from other races, and 0.16% from two or more races. Hispanic or Latino of any race were 0.64% of the population. 4% of the population claim German descent and 9% claim Irish descent.

There were 482 households, of which 34.0% had children under the age of 18 living with them, 51.0% were married couples living together, 14.5% had a female householder with no husband present, and 30.7% were non-families. 28.6% of all households were made up of individuals, and 15.6% had someone living alone who was 65 years of age or older. The average household size was 2.56 and the average family size was 3.17.

27.7% of the population were under the age of 18, 8.2% from 18 to 24, 26.6% from 25 to 44, 23.4% from 45 to 64, and 14.0% who were 65 years of age or older. The median age was 35 years. For every 100 females, there were 83.5 males. For every 100 females age 18 and over, there were 80.0 males.

The median household income was $26,316 and the median family income was $31,458. Males had a median income of $28,646 versus $16,417 for females. The per capita income for the town was $13,982. About 18.9% of families and 24.2% of the population were below the poverty line, including 32.1% of those under age 18 and 25.7% of those age 65 or over.

Education
Raleigh is served by the Smith County School District.

Raleigh High School is the educational center for the towns of Raleigh, Polkville and Sylvarena. Its school colors are maroon and white. Its mascot is Rah-Lee the Lion.

Events
Raleigh is the site of the annual Raleigh heritage festival and is the former home of The National Tobacco Spitting Contest.

Notable people
 Christopher "Big Black" Boykin, American entertainer and musician
 Bobby Keyes, Professional American, Canadian defensive back Edmonton Eskimos CFL
 Donte Moncrief, (American Football) Wide Receiver Houston Texans
 Mark Tullos, lawyer and current state representative

References

External links

Towns in Smith County, Mississippi
Towns in Mississippi
County seats in Mississippi